The National Committee for the Liberation of Yugoslavia (NKOJ), also known as the Yugoslav Committee of National Liberation, was the World War II provisional executive body of the Democratic Federal Yugoslavia, established on 29 November 1943 by the Yugoslav Partisans, a resistance movement and military arm of the Communist Party of Yugoslavia, led by Josip Broz Tito; in opposition to the London-based Yugoslav government-in-exile, headed by King Peter II.

History 
The Committee was elected by Tito's Anti-Fascist Council for the National Liberation of Yugoslavia (AVNOJ), the provisional legislative body, during its second session (29–30 November 1943), in Jajce. The Committee consisted of the President, three Vice-Presidents and the required number of Trustees, and for his work fit the AVNOJ and the Presidency of AVNOJ, which is appointed by its members.
During the same session, on 30 November 1943, the AVNOJ also appointed Josip Broz Tito as Prime Minister.

The Committee pursued the liberation in hard conditions of life, supplying the armies with many difficulties and facing the consequences of war and death on devastated battlefields, with a poor economy, and problematic foreign affairs related to the international recognition of communist Yugoslavia.

The Committee seat was in Drvar until May 1944, in Vis from May to October 1944, and then in Belgrade.
On 7 March 1945, following an agreement with the Yugoslav government-in-exile (Tito–Šubašić Agreements), the Committee was lifted and a new Yugoslav provisional government was formed, with Tito still as Prime Minister.

Cabinet 
The following list is based on the work Tito and His People by Howard Fast.

Presidency

Commissioners 
 Josip Smodlaka, for Foreign Affairs
 Vlada Zečević, for Internal Affairs
 Ivan Milutinović, for Agriculture
 Dušan Sernec, for Finance
 Sreten Žujović, for Transport
 Milivoje Jambrišak, for Public Health (until 10 December 1943)
 Zlatan Sremec, for Public Health (since 10 December 1943)
 Todor Vujasinović, for Economic Reconstruction
 Anton Kržišnik, for Social Affairs (Social Welfare)
 Frane Frol, for Justice
 Mile Peruničić, for Supplies
 Rade Pribićević, for Public Works (Buildings)
 Sulejman Filipović, for Forests and Mines (Forestry)
 Andrija Hebrang, for Trade and Industry (since 31 October 1944)

 Others
 Edvard Kocbek, for Slovenia, and for Education
 Emanuel Čučkov, for Agriculture
 Nikola Petrović, for Trade and Supply

As the war didn't allow all members to be in session, the Presidency appointed the following Deputy Commissioners:
 Vladimir Bakarić, for Foreign Affairs
 Ivan Milutinović (Agriculture), for Finance/Economy
 Sreten Žujović (Transport), for Buildings
 Todor Vujasinović (Economic Reconstruction), for Food
 Edward Kocbek (Slovenia/Education), for Social Affairs

References

Bibliography 
 
 

Yugoslav Partisans
Yugoslav Resistance
Yugoslavia in World War II
Vis (island)
History of Jajce